The Seventh-day Adventist Church is a major Christian denomination with a significant presence in India with over 1,138,508 members as of June 30, 2020. The Seventh-day Adventist Church splits India into seven Unions.

Sub Fields
East-Central India Union Section
Adilabad Region 
East Telangana Section 
Guntur Region 
Hyderabad Metro Section 
North Andhra Section 
North Orissa Region 
North Rayalaseema Section 
Northeast Andhra Section 
Orissa Section 
South Andhra Section 
South Rayalaseema Section 
Southeast Andhra Section
Vishaka Metro Region 
West Telangana Section  
Northeast India Union Section
Arunachal Pradesh Region
Assam Region
Garo Section
Khasi Jaintia Conference
Manipur Conference
Mizo Conference 
Nagaland Region 
Tripura Region
Northern India Union Section
Bihar Region 
Central Uttar Pradesh Region
Chhattisgarh Region 
Delhi Metro Region
Eastern Jharkhand Section 
Eastern Uttar Pradesh Section 
Haryana Region 
Himachal Pradesh Region 
Kolkata Region
Madhya Pradesh Region 
North Bengal Section 
North India Section 
Rajasthan Section 
South Bengal Section 
Upper Ganges Section 
Uttarakhand Region
Western Jharkhand Section  
South-Central India Union Section
Bangalore Metro Conference 
Goa-West Karnataka Section 
Kolar-Chinthamani Region 
North Karnataka Section 
Raichur-Bellary Region
South Karnataka Section  
Southeast India Union Section
Chennai Metro Section 
Coimbatore Tirpur Region 
Dharmapuri Region 
Erode Nilgiris Section 
Kanchipuram-Chengalpet Section 
North Tamil Conference 
Pudukottai-Thirumayam Region 
Sivagangai Ramanathapuram Section 
South Tamil Conference 
Thanjavur-Karaikal Section 
Theni-Periyakulam Region 
Vellore Region 
Villupuram-Thindivanam Region
Southwest India Union Section

Alappuzha-Pathanamthitta Section
Idukki Section 
Malabar Region 
North Kerala Section 
South Kerala Section  
Western India Union Section
Central Maharashtra Conference 
Gujarat Conference 
Mumbai Metro Section 
North Maharashtra Section 
Saurashtra Region
South Gujarat Region 
South Maharashtra Section 
Vidharbha Region
Andaman and Nicobar Island Region

Education facilities
The Seventh-day Adventist Church operates 104 secondary schools in India. The church also operates the following Colleges of higher learning named .

 Spicer Adventist University
 Northeast Adventist Adventist University
 Roorkee Adventist College
 Flaiz Adventist College
 Helen Lowry College of Arts & Commerce
  METAS Adventist College
  Vellore Adventist College of Education

Medical facilities
The church operates eleven hospitals in India named Aizawl Adventist Hospital; METAS Adventist Hospital, Ranchi; METAS Adventist Hospital, Surat; METAS Gifford Memorial Hospital; Milton Mattison Memorial Hospital; Ottapalam Seventh-day Adventist Hospital; Pune Adventist Hospital; Ruby Nelson Memorial Hospital; Seventh-day Adventist Medical Centre; Simla Sanitarium Hospital & Thanjavur Adventist Hospital. The Seventh-day Adventist Church has two orphanages named Elim Adventist Home & Sunshine Children's Home. The Adventist Development and Relief Agency India is active since 1992.

Publishers
Oriental Watchman Publishing House

Media Centers
Adventist Media Centre-India

History
William Lenker and A. T. Stroup started selling Adventist literature in Madras in 1893. The Southern Asia Division was organized under president John E. Fulton in 1919 with 26 churches and 978 members.

See also
Australian Union Conference of Seventh-day Adventists
Seventh-day Adventist Church in Brazil 
Seventh-day Adventist Church in Canada
Seventh-day Adventist Church in the People's Republic of China 
Seventh-day Adventist Church in Colombia 
Seventh-day Adventist Church in Cuba
Seventh-day Adventist Church in Ghana 
Italian Union of Seventh-day Adventist Churches
New Zealand Pacific Union Conference of Seventh-day Adventists
Seventh-day Adventist Church in Nigeria 
Adventism in Norway
Romanian Union Conference of Seventh-day Adventists
Seventh-day Adventist Church in Sweden 
Seventh-day Adventist Church in Thailand
Seventh-day Adventist Church in Tonga 
Seventh-day Adventists in Turks and Caicos Islands
Christianity in India
Seventh-day Adventist Church, Nilokheri

References

Christian denominations in India
History of the Seventh-day Adventist Church
India
Seventh-day Adventist Church in Asia